The 1999 Golden Globes (Portugal) were the fourth edition of the Golden Globes (Portugal).

Winners

Cinema:
Best Film: Zona J, with Leonel Vieira
nominated: Os Mutantes, with Teresa Villaverde
Best Director: Manoel de Oliveira
nominated: Teresa Villaverde, in Os Mutantes
Best Actress: Ana Bustorff, in Sapatos Pretos, and Zona J
nominated: Ana Moreira, in Os Mutantes
Best Actor: Diogo Infante, in Pesadelo Cor de Rosa
nominated: Alexandre Pinto, in Os Mutantes
nominated: Félix Fountoura, in Zona J

Sports:
Personality of the Year: Luís Figo

Fashion:
Personality of the Year: Manuel Alves and José Manuel Gonçalves

Theatre:
Personality of the Year: Ruy de Carvalho

Music:
Best Performer: Rui Veloso
Best Group: Silence 4
Best Song: Todo o tempo do mundo- Rui Veloso

Television:
Best Information Host: José Alberto Carvalho
Best Entertainment Host: Herman José
Best Fiction and Comedy Show: Médico de Família
Best Entertainment Show: Herman Enciclopédia
Best Information Program: Grande Reportagem

Career Award:
Carlos do Carmo

References

1998 film awards
1998 music awards
1998 television awards
Golden Globes (Portugal)
1999 in Portugal